The anime television series Bartender is based on the manga series of the same name written and illustrated by Araki Joh. The series was directed by Masaki Watanabe, written by Yasuhiro Imagawa, and produced by Palm Studio. It originally aired between October 15, 2006, and December 31, 2006, on Fuji Television. The episodes were later combined into five DVDs, released by Pony Canyon from December 20, 2006, to April 18, 2007.

In November 2010, through the 24th issue of Super Jump, it was announced the production of a Japanese television drama series starring Masaki Aiba. Directed by Osamu Katayama and written by Natsuko Takahashi, it aired on TV Asahi "Friday Night Drama" time slot from February 4, 2011, to April 1, 2011. On August 5, 2011, TC Entertainment released all episodes in a Blu-ray Disc box set.

Episode list

Anime

Drama

References

Bartender (manga)
Bartender